Mario Gaspar Pérez Martínez (born 24 November 1990) is a Spanish professional footballer who plays for EFL Championship club Watford as a right-back.

He spent 15 years of his career at Villarreal, making 424 official appearances and winning the 2020–21 UEFA Europa League. In July 2022, he signed with Watford.

Mario Gaspar played his first match with Spain in 2015, scoring in that game.

Club career

Villarreal
Born in Novelda, Alicante, Valencian Community, Mario Gaspar finished his development at Villarreal CF after arriving from Albacete Balompié. On 15 March 2009, aged just 18, he made his first-team – and La Liga – debut, in a game against Atlético Madrid: he replaced Giuseppe Rossi with roughly 25 minutes to play, with the score at 2–1, but the Yellow Submarine eventually lost 3–2 away.

Mario Gaspar spent the entire 2009–10 season with the reserves. He started in all 31 games he appeared in, as they easily retained their newly-found Segunda División status.

Midway through the following campaign, Mario Gaspar was definitely promoted to the main squad following Ángel López's severe knee injury, also making the starting XI. On 16 January 2011, in his first start, he played the full 90 minutes in a 4–2 home win over CA Osasuna, finishing with 22 appearances. He scored his first competitive goal on 1 May 2012, opening the 3–2 victory at Sporting de Gijón towards the end of a season which finished with relegation. In May 2014, with a year remaining on his contract, it was extended for a further four.

Mario Gaspar scored his first goal in European competition on 21 August 2014, concluding a 3–0 away defeat of FC Astana in the first leg of their UEFA Europa League play-off (7–0 aggregate). In January 2017, he signed a new deal to last until 2023.

On 18 March 2018, Mario Gaspar played his 300th official match for Villarreal, in a 2–1 win at Atlético; only Cani, Marcos Senna and teammate Bruno Soriano had reached that figure before for the club. He filled in as captain during the lengthy injuries of the last of those players, and on 21 April 2021 with a 2–1 away loss to Deportivo Alavés he joined him at 400 matches.

In 2021–22, still under manager Unai Emery, Mario Gaspar was kept out of the team by both Serge Aurier and Juan Foyth.

Watford
On 29 July 2022, Mario Gaspar signed for EFL Championship club Watford. He made his league debut on 8 August, a 77th-minute substitute for Hassane Kamara in the 1–1 draw at West Bromwich Albion.

International career
Mario Gaspar earned 16 caps for Spain at youth level, including two for the under-21s. He received his first call up to the full side in October 2015, making his debut on the 12th by scoring the game's only goal in Ukraine – the last round, the nation had already secured the first position in its group – for the UEFA Euro 2016 qualifiers. He repeated the feat the following match, scoring an overhead kick to open a 2–0 friendly win against England in Alicante, with the strike being nominated for the FIFA Puskás Award.

Career statistics

Club

International
Scores and results list Spain's goal tally first, score column indicates score after each Mario Gaspar goal.

Honours
Villarreal
UEFA Europa League: 2020–21

References

External links

1990 births
Living people
People from Vinalopó Mitjà
Sportspeople from the Province of Alicante
Spanish footballers
Footballers from the Valencian Community
Association football defenders
La Liga players
Segunda División players
Segunda División B players
Tercera División players
Villarreal CF C players
Villarreal CF B players
Villarreal CF players
English Football League players
Watford F.C. players
UEFA Europa League winning players
Spain youth international footballers
Spain under-21 international footballers
Spain international footballers
Spanish expatriate footballers
Expatriate footballers in England
Spanish expatriate sportspeople in England